Bindiya is a Bangladeshi film actress who has starred in films like Dabangg (2014), Murder 2 (2015) and Mastan O Police (2017). Dabangg was her debut film, where she starred opposite Jayed Khan. She was criticised for her vulgar scenes with Khan.

References

Bangladeshi actresses
Bangladeshi film actresses
Year of birth missing (living people)
Living people
Place of birth missing (living people)